Engelbert Schmid is a classical musician and horn maker.

After playing with the Berlin Radio Symphony Orchestra and the Berlin Philharmonic, solo-horn with the Munich Radio Orchestra for ten years,
in 1980 Engelbert Schmid exhibited his Horns for the first time.
In 1990 he established his own workshop. As a Master Craftsman he personally trained his present instrument makers.

References 

Musical instrument manufacturing companies of Germany
Players of the Berlin Philharmonic
Living people
Year of birth missing (living people)
Place of birth missing (living people)
Brass instrument manufacturing companies